Simpson's leaf-toed gecko or Western Galápagos leaf-toed gecko (Phyllodactylus simpsoni) is a species of gecko. It is endemic to Isabela Island and Fernandina Island in the Galápagos Islands.

References

Phyllodactylus
Reptiles described in 2019